PT Sarinah (Persero) is an Indonesian retail company owned by PT Aviasi Pariwisata Indonesia (Persero) (InJourney), a state-owned holding company. Its flagship store, Sarinah Building in M.H. Thamrin Street of Central Jakarta, was the first skyscraper to be built in Jakarta as well as the first modern department store in the city. In addition to Thamrin, Sarinah also has a number of other outlets namely at Pejaten Village in South Jakarta, Banyumanik (Semarang) and Malang.

History 
Sarinah was incorporated on 17 August 1962 as PT Department Store Indonesia "Sarinah".

In the early 1960s, Indonesia was hit by very high inflation rates. President Sukarno believed that a department store would act as a price stabilizer to help keep prices under control, citing similar department stores in Communist states used as such price stabilizers (for example, the Soviet GUM, the Czech Bílá labuť, and the Polish CDT). The first store in Jakarta was built by Obayashi Corporation using Japanese war reparation funds, and opened in August 1966. The project was conceived by President Sukarno, who named it Sarinah after his childhood nanny.

In an effort to pursue its price stabilization agenda, state-owned Sarinah department store published weekly grocery price lists. Sukarno affirmed that "The Sarinah department store will become one of the important tools for the organization of Indonesian socialism..." and "if Sarinah sells a kebaya for 10 rupiah then another retailer will not dare to sell the same kebaya for 20 rupiah". However, it failed almost immediately in this role as there was a limit to what one store or even a few stores could do in such a large country. Sarinah struggled to compete with other retailers and went into debt as it expanded aggressively into other cities in Indonesia.

In the early 1970s, in an effort to survive, Sarinah moved its focus to local handicrafts, especially batik. It was renamed into the present name in 1979.

On 6 October 2021, the government of Indonesia handed over the majority of the company shares to PT Aviasi Pariwisata Indonesia (Persero), as an effort to form a state-owned holding company engaged in aviation and tourism.

References

Quotes

Cited works

External links
 

Department stores of Indonesia
InJourney
Retail companies established in 1962
Indonesian companies established in 1962